EUGEN - EUropean Geosciences students Network is youth organization based in Germany. Main goal of EUGEN is organizing annual summer camps for students in geo-sciences all across Europe. The EUGEN was created in summer 1995 during the national meeting of German geology students. First summer camp was held in August 1996 in Black Forest in Germany with participation of 120 students from 18 European universities. Since then every August is held EUGEN meeting every time on different location in Europe and last for one whole week. The program schedule usually contains three days reserved for geological fieldtrips, organized by the local hosts (students of geology) in league with their university professors and/or national geological survey. One day is reserved for some sightseeing-trips to interesting local destinations. Talks and presentations from members of participating universities and supporting organizations are also part of the program. The tradition calls for one afternoon dedicated to the famous Geolympix - a team competition in highly entertainable fun-sport games. On every EUGEN meeting the contest for next EUGEN meetings are held. The countries that nominate themselves make presentations and participants vote for the winner. The next EUGEN meeting will be held in Austria.

List of EUGEN meetings 

 1996: Schwarzwald, Germany
 1997: Aveiro, Portugal
 1998: Transylvania, Romania
 1999: Sicily, Italy
 2000: Sierra del Moncayo, Spain
 2001: Platelai, Lithuania
 2002: Eifel, Germany
 2003: Kobarid, Slovenia
 2004: Buses, Latvia
 2005: Lokve, Croatia
 2006: Braganca, Portugal
 2007: Cantiano, Italy
 2008: Reichenau/Tamins, Switzerland
 2009: Someren, Netherlands
 2010: Gjiri i Lalzit, Albania
 2011: Duburys lake, Lithuania
 2012: Harz Mountains, Germany
 2013: Calabria, Italy
 2014: Komen, Slovenia
 2015: Stryszów, Poland
 2016: Kinrooi, Belgium
 2017: Karlovac, Croatia
 2018: Carinthia, Austria

External links
EUGEN e.V.

Geo
International student societies
Student societies in Germany